Bijoya Chakravarty (born 7 October 1939), is an Indian politician from the Bharatiya Janata Party. She was awarded India's fourth highest civilian award the Padma Shri in 2021.

Background
Bijoya began her political career in the Janata Party. She subsequently joined the regional Asom Gana Parishad and served in the Rajya Sabha from 1986 to 1992. Following her stint in the Rajya Sabha, she joined the Bhartiya Janata Party.

She represented the Gauhati in the 13th Lok Sabha. She won this seat for the BJP for the first time ever in 1999. Under the premiership of Atal Bihari Vajpayee, she served as the Union Minister of State for Water Resources. In 2004, the BJP decided to field singer Bhupen Hazarika in her place, causing widespread protests from BJP party workers. Hazarika lost the elections. The BJP understood its mistake and re-nominated Bijoya in the 2009 Lok Sabha election from the Gauhati seat. As a result, she again won the seat in 2009 and 2014 representing the BJP.

Personal life 
Chakravarty was born to B.K. Thakur and Mukhyada Thakur on  7 October 1939 in Baligaon village of Jorhat district in Assam. A post graduate with Masters of Arts in English language, she received her education from Guwahati University and Banaras Hindu University. She married Jiten Chakravarty on 1 June 1965, with whom she has a son and a daughter. Her daughter Suman Haripriya was elected to the Assam Legislative Assembly election in 2016 from Hajo Vidhan Sabha constituency.

Her son, Ranajit Chakravarty, died in May 2017 at the age of 49.

Positions held 
1977–1979 District Secretary, Janata Party, Mangaldoi (Assam)
1986–1992 Member of parliament, Rajya Sabha of Asom Gana Parishad
1999–2004 Member of parliament, Lok Sabha representing Gauhati (Assam)
1999–2004 Union Minister of State for Water Resources
2007–present National Vice-President, Bhartiya Janata Party

References

External links
 Official biographical sketch in Parliament of India website
 

1939 births
Living people
People from Jorhat district
Women in Assam politics
India MPs 2009–2014
Lok Sabha members from Assam
India MPs 1999–2004
Rajya Sabha members from Assam
India MPs 2014–2019
Janata Party politicians
Asom Gana Parishad politicians
Bharatiya Janata Party politicians from Assam
20th-century Indian women politicians
20th-century Indian politicians
21st-century Indian women politicians
21st-century Indian politicians
Women union ministers of state of India
Union ministers of state of India
Recipients of the Padma Shri in public affairs
Women members of the Rajya Sabha
Women members of the Lok Sabha